The Egyptian National Military Museum is the official museum of the Egyptian Army.

Location
The National Military Museum is located at the north western area of the three Haram Palaces, inside the Cairo Citadel. It overlooks the Mokattam Hills and the entrance to the Citadel. The Haram Palaces were constructed by Mohamed Ali Pasha in 1872.

Establishment
The museum was established in 1937 at the old building of the Egyptian Ministry of War in downtown Cairo. It was later moved to a temporary location in the Garden City district of Cairo. In November 1949 the museum was moved to the Haram Palace at the Cairo citadel. It has been renovated several times since, in 1982, 1993 and 2011.

Notable halls

Ottoman and Mohamed Ali Pasha Militaria Hall
1948 Arab–Israeli War Hall
1952 Revolution Hall
1956 Suez War Hall

1967 War Hall
1973 War Hall (not detailed due to dedication of 6th of October Panorama as a museum to 1973 war)

See also
6th of October Panorama

Gallery

References

1938 establishments in Egypt
Museums established in 1938
Museums in Cairo
Palaces in Cairo
History museums in Egypt
Historic house museums in Egypt
Architecture in Egypt